Daisy Fisher, born Daisy Gertrude Fisher; (1888–2 April 1969) was an English novelist and playwright. She was the writer of several romantic novels, a lyricist, scriptwriter, actress and singer. In the 1920s she wrote the lyrics for some of Eric Coates' compositions. In 1926 she published her first book Lavender Ladies A Comedy in Three Acts followed by more in the 1930s. Fisher authored some plays with the song writer Harold Simpson, Ronald Jeans and Clifford Seyler. She was the wife of Herbert Mason the film director and producer who previously acted on stage (including several productions at the Birmingham Repertory Theatre). After the Second World War they worked together on some plays.

Early life

Daisy Gertrude Fisher was born in 1888 to William Edgar Fisher (an accountant) and Emma Louisa (née Beasley) daughter of Benjamin Beasley. After Brampton Park burned down in 1907 she turned to the theatre and joined as a chorus girl.

Career

One of Fisher's earliest plays was Cinderella performed at the Birmingham Repertory Theatre (26 December 1914– 29 January 1915). Fisher and the composer Eric Coates starred in The Punch Bowl, which Herbert Mason a stage actor stage managed and choreographed. Fisher's comedy play Lavender Ladies was performed at the Comedy Theatre from 29 July – 21 November 1925. The play starred Herbert Marshall and Louise Hampton. Additionally it was Lydia Sherwood's debut on stage. Fisher and Harold Simpson were authors of The Cave Man, which Mason also presented, produced and had a role in. Louise Hampton also had a part in the play.

In 1933 The Hill Beyond was published. It acts as a sequel to The Gates Swings Open and is about a girl from between settling down in the countryside with her husband or an exciting life in the theatrical world in London. In 1935 Fisher wrote the story for Things Are Looking Up with Albert de Courville, Stafford Dickens and Con West. It was the film debut for Vivien Leigh who had an uncredited role as a school girl. In 1937 Fisher's A Ship Comes Home was performed at St Martin's Theatre, London. The play starred Michael Redgrave who later had a role in Mason's A Window in London. Mason and Fisher financed and were authors of Lend Me Robin (1948), which was shown at Embassy Theatre a few years before it was sold to the Central School of Speech and Drama. It was a comedy about a wife who tries to win back her philandering husband (portrayed by Charles Goldner) by taking a lover. The play also starred William Mervyn who later had a part in Conflict of Wings produced by Mason. Three years later they worked on an eternal triangle thriller Dangerous Woman.

Daisy Fisher died on 2 April 1969 in London.

Personal life and family

Fisher first met her future husband when they were in a play about David Garrick with Mason taking the lead. In 1914 they married before Mason and her brother fought in the First World War. Her brother Leslie Fisher was killed in action at the age of 30 on 14 August 1915. She survived Mason with their daughter and son. Their son Michael (b. December 1924) became a radio producer at the BBC and wrote several books.

Publications

Lyricist

Filmography

Film

Theatre

References

Bibliography

Secondary sources

 Gale, Maggie. (1996). West End Women and the London Stage 1918–1962. Routledge
 Reid, John Howard. (2005). Hollywood's Miracles of Entertainment. Lulu.com
 Wearing, J.P. (1982). The London Stage 1910–1919: A Calendar of Productions, Performers and Personnel. Rowman & Littlefield Education 
 Wearing, J.P. (2014). The London Stage 1920–1929: A Calendar of Productions, Performers and Personnel. Rowman & Littlefield Education (2nd edition)
 Wearing, J.P. (2014). The London Stage 1930-1939: A Calendar of Productions, Performers and Personnel. Rowman & Littlefield
 Wearing, J.P. (2014). The London Stage 1940–1949: A Calendar of Productions, Performers and Personnel. Rowman & Littlefield Education (2nd edition)
 Payne, Michael. (2013). The Life and Music of Eric Coates. Ashgate Publishing Ltd
 D'Arcy Mackay, Constance. (1927). Children's Theatres and Plays. D. Appleton & Company
 Barranger, Milly S. (2004). Margaret Webster: A Life in the Theater. University of Michigan Press
 Hobson, Harold. (1950). Theatre – Volume 2. Longmans, Green and Co
 Kemp, Thomas C. (1943). Birmingham Repertory Theatre: The Playhouse and the Man. Cornish Brothers Limited
 Major and Mrs Holt. (1990). The Biography of Captain Bruce Bairnsfather: In Search of the Better Ole. Pen and Sword

External links
 
 A Ship Comes Home by Daisy Fisher at The Spectator Archive
 Daisy Fisher on Great War Theatre website
 Daisy Fisher at Theatricalia 

1888 births
1967 deaths
20th-century English dramatists and playwrights
English women dramatists and playwrights
English lyricists
English women novelists
20th-century English novelists
British women screenwriters
English stage actresses
English romantic fiction writers
20th-century English women writers
Women romantic fiction writers
20th-century English screenwriters